Sugar Loaf, sometimes called The Sugar Loaf, is a prominent hill in Carmarthenshire, Wales beside the A483 trunk road some  south-west of Llanwrtyd Wells. It is a popular viewpoint and picnic spot within easy reach on foot from the roadside car parks to the northeast and to the south. There is a stop on the nearby Heart of Wales Line called Sugar Loaf railway station.

The name Sugar Loaf has been applied to numerous hills which have a perceived resemblance to a sugarloaf; the nearest is the Sugar Loaf on the border between Powys and Monmouthshire.

External links
 Photos of Sugar Loaf on Geograph website

References

Mountains and hills of Carmarthenshire
Landmarks in Wales
Marilyns of Wales